Hiram Berdan (September 6, 1824 – March 31, 1893) was an American engineer, inventor, military officer, marksman, and guiding force behind and commanding colonel of the United States Volunteer Sharpshooter Regiments during the American Civil War. He was the inventor of the Berdan rifle, the Berdan centerfire primer and other weapons and accessories.

Early life
Berdan was born in Phelps, a small town in Ontario County, New York. A mechanical engineer in New York City, he had been the top rifle shot in the country for fifteen years prior to the Civil War. He invented a repeating rifle and a patented musket ball before the war. He had also developed the first commercial gold amalgamation machine to separate gold from ore. He invented a reaper and a mechanical bakery. His inventions had brought him wealth and international fame.

Civil War
In the summer and fall of 1861, he was involved in the recruiting of eighteen companies, from eight states, which were formed into two sharpshooter regiments with the backing of General Winfield Scott and President Abraham Lincoln. Berdan was named as Colonel of the resultant 1st and 2nd U.S. Sharpshooters on November 30, 1861. His men, who had to pass rigorous marksmanship tests, were dressed in distinctive green uniforms and equipped with Sharps breech-loading rifles. Even when assigned to a brigade, the regiments were usually detached for special assignments on the field of battle. They were frequently used for skirmish duty. Berdan fought at the Seven Days Battles and Second Battle of Bull Run. In September 1862, his sharpshooters were at the Battle of Shepherdstown. Berdan commanded the 2nd Brigade, 3rd Division, 3rd Corps, Army of the Potomac in February and March 1863, then he commanded the 3rd Brigade at the Battle of Chancellorsville.  Although Berdan was an innovative officer, as a leader he proved unpopular with the officers and soldiers under his command.  In 1862, several of the sharpshooters' officers formally complained to General Daniel Butterfield, Berdan's immediate commander, that Berdan was both dishonest and a coward.  In July 1862, General Fitz John Porter condemned Berdan as incompetent.

Gettysburg
At the Battle of Gettysburg, his two regiments of sharpshooters played an important role in delaying Confederate attacks on Devil's Den and the Peach Orchard. In a sharp encounter in Pitzer's Woods on Seminary Ridge, the 1st U.S. Sharpshooters stalled the advancing Alabama brigade of Cadmus Wilcox. Berdan assumed command of J. H. Hobart Ward's brigade when the latter became acting division commander (David B. Birney having become acting corps commander following the wounding of Daniel Sickles) and led the division throughout the rest of the campaign, as well as during the subsequent Bristoe and Mine Run campaigns.

Post-war career
Berdan resigned his commission January 2, 1864, and returned to his career as an engineer and inventor. On December 8, 1868, President Andrew Johnson nominated Berdan for appointment to the brevet grade of brigadier general of volunteers, to rank from March 13, 1865, for the Battle of Chancellorsville, at which he led a brigade, and the U.S. Senate confirmed the appointment on February 16, 1869. Although President Johnson also nominated Berdan for appointment to the brevet grade of major general of volunteers to rank from the same date for his services at the Battle of Gettysburg, at which he also led a brigade, the U.S. Senate did not confirm that appointment. Despite the lack of necessary Senate confirmation of the appointment to make it official, many sources refer to Berdan as a brevet major general and even his grave stone in Arlington National Cemetery indicates he was a brevet major general.

He was considered by many to be a crack marksman and innovator, but unfit for field command. Berdan subsequently invented numerous engines of war, including a twin-screw submarine gunboat, a torpedo boat for evading torpedo nets, a long-distance rangefinder and a distance fuse for shrapnel.

Death
Berdan died unexpectedly on March 31, 1893 and was buried in Arlington National Cemetery.

Fictional portrayals

The part of Hiram Berdan was played by Kurtwood Smith in the 1986 ABC miniseries.

A film created by Silver Domino Productions was based on Berdan and his men.

See also

 List of American Civil War brevet generals (Union)

References

Further reading
 Stevens, C.A., Berdan's United States Sharpshooters in the Army of the Potomac, 1861–1865. ,

External links
 History of U.S. Sharpshooters
 Brief biography and photo gallery

Union Army generals
Firearm designers
Ammunition designers
19th-century American inventors
People from Phelps, New York
People of New York (state) in the American Civil War
Burials at Arlington National Cemetery
1824 births
1893 deaths